The 1970 Air Canada Silver Broom, the men's world curling championship, was held at the Utica Memorial Auditorium in Utica, New York, United States between 18 and 22 March 1970.

The event was sparsely attended with only 200-300 fans for some of the afternoon games to about 2,000 for the final. In one draw, bored high school students began booing and cheering shots before resulting to throwing paperclips onto the ice "caused havoc with a number of shots."

Teams

Notes
 Unclear participants.
 Throws first rocks.

Standings

Results

Draw 1

Draw 2

Draw 3

Draw 4

Draw 5

Draw 6

Draw 7

Tiebreaker

Tiebreaker 1

Tiebreaker 2

Playoffs

Semifinal

Final

References

External links

World Men's Curling Championship
Curling
Air Canada Silver Broom, 1970
1970 in sports in New York (state)
Utica, New York
Curling in New York (state)
March 1970 sports events in the United States
International curling competitions hosted by the United States
Sports competitions in New York (state)